Campephilus is a genus of large American woodpeckers in the family Picidae.

Taxonomy
The genus Campephilus was introduced by English zoologist George Robert Gray in 1840, with the ivory-billed woodpecker (Campephilus principalis) as the type species. The genus name combines the Ancient Greek kampē meaning "caterpillar" and philos meaning "loving". The genus is placed in the tribe Campephilini in the subfamily Picinae and is sister to a clade containing woodpeckers from Southeast Asia in the genera Chrysocolaptes, Blythipicus, and Reinwardtipicus.

Species
The genus contains 11 species:

A fossil species, C. dalquesti, was described from bones found in Late Pleistocene deposits of Scurry County, Texas.

References

External links

 
Bird genera
Endemic birds of North America
Taxa named by George Robert Gray